Dante is a lunar impact crater that is located on the far side of the Moon. It lies in the northern hemisphere exactly opposite the prime meridian facing the Earth. The nearest craters of note are Larmor to the north and Morse to the southeast. To the southwest is the oddly shaped Buys-Ballot.

This crater is overlain by part of the ray system radiating from Larmor Q to the northwest. The rim of Dante is circular but somewhat eroded. The fresh crater Dante G is attached to the exterior along the east-southeastern rim. The interior floor of this crater is uneven and marked by several small impacts.

The crater lies within the Freundlich-Sharonov Basin.

Satellite craters
By convention these features are identified on lunar maps by placing the letter on the side of the crater midpoint that is closest to Dante.

References

 
 
 
 
 
 
 
 
 
 
 
 

Impact craters on the Moon
Dante Alighieri